The 2016 WCHA Men's Ice Hockey Tournament was played between March 11 and March 19, 2016, at four conference arenas and the Van Andel Arena in Grand Rapids, Michigan. By winning the tournament, Ferris State was awarded the Broadmoor Trophy and received the WCHA's automatic bid to the 2016 NCAA Division I Men's Ice Hockey Tournament.

This was the last WCHA tournament where an All-Tournament Team was named. This is also the only year with an All-Tournament Team where the Tournament MVP was not also named to the All-Tournament Team.

Format
The first round of the postseason tournament features a best-of-three games format. The top eight conference teams participate in the tournament. Teams are seeded No. 1 through No. 8 according to their final conference standing, with a tiebreaker system used to seed teams with an identical number of points accumulated. The top four seeded teams each earn home ice and host one of the lower seeded teams.

The winners of the first round series advance to the Van Andel Arena for the WCHA Final Five, a holdover from previous tournaments where it was used as the collective name of the quarterfinal, semifinal, and championship rounds. The Final Five uses a single-elimination format. Teams are re-seeded No. 1 through No. 4 according to the final regular season conference standings.

Conference standings
Note: GP = Games played; W = Wins; L = Losses; T = Ties; PTS = Points; GF = Goals For; GA = Goals Against

Bracket
Teams are reseeded after the first round

Note: * denotes overtime periods

Results

First round
All times are local.

(1) Michigan Tech vs. (8) Alaska

(2) Minnesota State vs. (7) Lake Superior State

(3) Bowling Green vs. (6) Bemidji State

(4) Ferris State vs. (5) Northern Michigan

Semifinals
All times are local (UTC−4).

(3) Bowling Green  vs. (2) Minnesota State

(4) Ferris State vs. (1) Michigan Tech

Championship
All times are local (UTC−4).

(4) Ferris State vs. (2) Minnesota State

Tournament awards

All-Tournament Team
F Kenny Babinski (Ferris State)
F Gerald Mayhew (Ferris State)
F Brad McClure (Minnesota State)
D Brandon Anselmini (Ferris State)
D Casey Nelson (Minnesota State)
G Cole Huggins (Minnesota State)

Most Valuable Player
G Darren Smith (Ferris State)

References

WCHA Men's Ice Hockey Tournament
WCHA Men's Ice Hockey Tournament
Ice hockey competitions in Michigan
College sports tournaments in Michigan
WCHA Men's Ice Hockey Tournament
Sports in Grand Rapids, Michigan